Caveana senuri is a moth in the family Lecithoceridae. It is endemic to Taiwan.

Description
The wingspan is 17–18 mm. The forewings are light orange, clothed with dark-brown scales between veins. The hindwings are evenly clothed with dark-brown scales and light orange along veins.

Etymology
The species name is derived from the Korean term senuri (meaning a new country).

References

Torodorinae
Moths of Taiwan
Endemic fauna of Taiwan
Moths described in 2013